This was researched by Banu Mallesh Chintakindi from Raipole. "Rajas" means dirt in Sinhala and Pali or Sanskrit, and "Rajaka" means the removers of dirt. They collected cloths by traveling home to home of higher castes but now that was obsolete in India states like Telangana and Andhra Pradesh, but they still perform several rituals in weddings and several festivals done in villages or their surrounding areas. In this community they are called chakali or Rajaka, meant to show pride for their caste. Many are agriculture cultivators and farmers.There are many freedom fighters from this community and the brave women chakali Ilamma who fought for the people.

Rituals performed
In the weddings of Govigama or Radala households, they provide the carpets ("Paawada" in Sinhala) and spread "Paadawa" for the groom. They provide "Piruwata" and "Udu wiyan" for the "Poruwa". And the cracking the skull when the couple getting down from Poruwa was performed by them.(cracking skull is performed for prosperity in weddings and puberty rituals in Sri Lanka)
In puberty rituals of Govi people the girl is bathed by a female of this caste and for their performance they were compensated through money, food, and also with the dress and jewelry given to her at that time.

British period
The creation of the above Mudaliyar class by the British in the 19th century, its restriction only to the Govigama caste, production of spurious caste hierarchy lists by this class and changes to the land tenure  system, resulted in this caste too being classified as a low caste during this period. Although contrary to history, some modern Govigama historians even go to the extent to now suggest that this caste was traditionally bound to serve the Govi caste.

The influential Mudaliyar class attempted to keep this caste and all other Sri Lankan castes out of colonial appointments. The oppression by the Mudaliars and connected headmen extended to demanding subservience, service and even restrictions on the type of personal names that could be used by this community.

Despite the above difficulties, several members of this caste became pioneer Ship chandlers, commercial Laundry operators and successful Merchants during the British period and were recognised as members of the local elite.

Modern period
Members of this community are in all the leading professions in Sri Lanka and in commerce and make positive contributions to society. They are gaining an increased say in modern Sri Lankan politics, mainly through the alternative political party Janatha Vimukthi Peramuna as the leadership selection processes within the two main political parties are not democratic.
Caste discrimination by the Buddhist monastic establishment is also an impediment to the progress of this community.

In literature
Senkottan-Novel written by Mahinda Kumara Masimbula 
"Lenchina mage nangiye" song

Notable people

 Ranasinghe Premadasa – Sri Lankan 3rd President (1989–1993) and prime minister (1978–1989)
 A. Ekanayake Gunasinha – Sri Lankan Politician 
 George E. de Silva - Former Minister of Industries, Industrial Research and Fisheries of Sri Lanka 
 Wimal Weerawansa – Present Minister of Small & Medium Business and Enterprise Development, Industries and Supply chain Management of Sri Lanka 
 Chakali ailamma – Chakali Ailamma (1919–1985) was an Indian revolutionary leader during the Telangana Rebellion. Her act of defiance against Zamindar Ramachandra Reddy, known as Visnoor Deshmukh, to cultivate her land became an inspiration for many during the rebellion against the feudal lords of the Telangana region.
 Madivala Machideva – Madivala Machideva, also known as Veera Ganachari Madivala Machideva, was an Indian warrior of the 12th-century.

See also 
 List of Dhobis
 Vannar

References 

 Ryan Bryce 1953 Caste in Modern Ceylon, Rutgers University Press
 Ceylon Gazetteer 1855

External links
 Andhra Pradesh Rajaka / Chakali Community website
 RAJAKA EMPLOYEES AND EDUCATED WELFARE ASSOCIATION website
 Rajaka Vikasa Kendra website
 Andhra Pradesh Rajaka Community website
 Rajaka Udupi Community website
 Madivala Karnataka Community website
 Rajaka Sankshema Trust website 

Sinhalese castes
Caste system in Sri Lanka
Telugu society